USS Eagle may refer to the following ships of the United States Navy:

 , was a 14-gun schooner in service from 1798 to 1801
 , was an 11-gun sloop in service on Lake Champlain during the War of 1812
 , was a 20-gun brig also on Lake Champlain, launched and named while the 1812 Eagle was in British hands
  was a 12-gun schooner of the New Orleans Squadron
 , was a yacht purchased in 1898 and in service until 1919
 , later renamed USS SP-145, was a patrol boat in commission from 1917 to 1919
 , was a Q-ship renamed Captor (PYc-40) shortly after commissioning in 1942
 , later USS PE-56, in commission from 1919 to 1945

See also
 , also known as "Eagle boats," commissioned in 1918 and 1919
  for several United States Coast Guard cutters
 
 Eagle was the name of the Lunar Module on Apollo 11

United States Navy ship names